"I'll Go Crazy If I Don't Go Crazy Tonight" is the fifth song from U2's 2009 album No Line on the Horizon.  The song was released as the album's third single in a digital format on 25 August 2009 and in a physical version released on 7 September 2009. Two music videos were made, one directed by David O'Reilly, and one by Alex Courtes.

Writing and recording
The band collaborated with will.i.am in the creation of the track; will.i.am receives an "additional production" credit on the finished version. It was first developed by Brian Eno under the title "Diorama" during a break in the recording sessions. The band reworked the track under the new title of "Crazy Tonight" before retitling it again as "I'll Go Crazy If I Don't Go Crazy Tonight". Several of the song's lyrics were influenced by Barack Obama's presidential campaign. Bono stated to Q magazine that the lyrics "[sound] like a T-shirt slogan to me", also noting that it was No Line on the Horizons equivalent to "Beautiful Day".

Live performances
"I'll Go Crazy If I Don't Go Crazy Tonight" was first played on 4 March 2009 on the Late Show with David Letterman, one of three performances of the song during No Line on the Horizon promotional appearances.

Redanka's "Kick the Darkness" remix arrangement of the song was played throughout the U2 360° Tour. Club feel lighting accompanied the song, while Larry Mullen Jr. walked around the outer stage playing a djembe. The performance in this unfamiliar style was intended to disorient the audience as the band moved from the "personal" first half of the concert into the "political" second half. (The only time the album version was performed during the tour was during the second show of the 360 Tour° in Barcelona where it was performed two times. For the first time the band played the remix and, then, as one of the encores, the album version was performed for a video shoot.)

Music videos

The first music video received its world premiere on 17 July 2009 through U2's YouTube channel. Directed by David O'Reilly and designed by Jon Klassen, it is the band's first animated music video since 1995's "Hold Me, Thrill Me, Kiss Me, Kill Me", and is one of the few not to feature the band. It depicts several people in a city undergoing hardships, and the events that interconnect them and bring them happiness as they decide to make changes in their lives. The video was entered in the 2009 Ottawa International Animation Festival.

The second music video was directed by Alex Courtes and produced by Malachy Mcanenny. While the O'Reilly video plays over the studio version of the song, the Courtes version is the single edit. It consists of a live performance taken from the U2 360° Tour, filmed at Camp Nou in Barcelona, Spain, on 2 July 2009.

Reception
Q called "I'll Go Crazy If I Don't Go Crazy Tonight" the band's "most unabashed pop song since 'Sweetest Thing'". while Mojo labelled it a "superficial pop anthem formed around a dainty kernel of pure melodic gold", calling the performance "[s]o cumulatively devastating is the band's delivery that it ennobles the succession of cute self-referential Bono homilies". Blender likened the "I'll Go Crazy If I Don't Go Crazy Tonight"'s piano parts to the hook of the Journey song "Faithfully", while Rolling Stone noted that the lyrics reflected Bono's inability to meet his own ideals. Rolling Stone also likened the "harrowing" beginning of the O'Reilly video to a Disney film, calling the animation "incredible". Eoin Butler, writing in The Irish Times''' The Ticket supplement, was less enthused about the release, labelling it U2's "most lacklustre offering to date". The song was nominated in the categories "Best Rock Performance by a Duo or Group With Vocals" and "Best Rock Song" for the 52nd Grammy Awards in 2010.

Release
In promotion "I'll Go Crazy If I Don't Go Crazy Tonight" was used in television commercials for a Blackberry application, called the "U2 Mobile App", which was developed as part of Research in Motion's sponsorship of the U2 360° Tour.

Formats and track listings
All lyrics written by Bono, all music composed by U2, except "Magnificent" (music also by Brian Eno and Danny Lanois, and lyrics also by the Edge).

Promotional releases

Commercial releases

Digital releases

Credits and personnel
Credits adapted from No Line on the Horizon'' liner notes.

U2 – music
Bono – lyrics
Steve Lillywhite – producer, mixer
will.i.am – additional production and keyboards
CJ Eiriksson – engineer, mixer
Tom Hough – assistant engineer
Declan Gaffney – additional engineering
Dave Emery – assistant mixer
Caroline Dale – cello
Cathy Thompson – violin
Terry Lawless – additional keyboards

Charts

See also
List of covers of U2 songs - I'll Go Crazy If I Don't Go Crazy Tonight

References

External links
Lyrics at U2.com

2009 singles
Pop rock songs
Interscope Records singles
Mercury Records singles
Song recordings produced by Steve Lillywhite
Song recordings produced by will.i.am
Songs written by Adam Clayton
Songs written by Bono
Songs written by the Edge
Songs written by Larry Mullen Jr.
U2 songs
2009 songs
Animated music videos
Number-one singles in Scotland